Rey Benedict Chan Nambatac (born January 27, 1994) is a Filipino professional basketball player for the Rain or Shine Elasto Painters of the Philippine Basketball Association (PBA). He played for the Letran Knights in the NCAA during his college days. He was selected seventh overall pick in the 2017 PBA draft by Rain or Shine Elasto Painters.

Professional career
In his PBA debut back on December 22, 2017, Nambatac recorded 5 points and 5 rebounds in almost 13 minutes of playing time on an 82–79 win over the TNT Katropa.

PBA career statistics

As of the end of 2022–23 season

Season-by-season averages

|-
| align=left | 
| align=left | Rain or Shine
| 34 || 15.1 || .376 || .403 || .600 || 2.6 || 1.3 || .6 || .1 || 5.0
|-
| align=left | 
| align=left | Rain or Shine
| 47 || 24.6 || .445 || .402 || .701 || 3.9 || 2.1 || .9 || .1 || 10.5
|-
| align=left | 
| align=left | Rain or Shine
| 12 || 24.9 || .312 || .250 || .729 || 2.9 || 3.2 || 1.3 || .2 || 8.7
|-
| align=left | 
| align=left | Rain or Shine
| 22 || 30.7 || .360 || .302 || .769 || 3.8 || 2.5 || .9 || .0 || 13.5
|-
| align=left | 
| align=left | Rain or Shine
| 34 || 28.3 || .387 || .307 || .755 || 4.0 || 3.4 || .9 || .1 || 13.3
|-class=sortbottom
| align="center" colspan=2 | Career
| 149 || 24.2 || .392 || .347 || .729 || 3.5 || 2.3 || .9 || .1 || 10.2

References

1994 births
Living people
Filipino men's basketball players
Sportspeople from Cagayan de Oro
Basketball players from Misamis Oriental
Philippines men's national basketball team players
Rain or Shine Elasto Painters players
Shooting guards
Letran Knights basketball players
Rain or Shine Elasto Painters draft picks